Krovostok is a Russian rap group formed in Moscow in 2003.

About the group 
At first, Krovostok was perceived as a joke (even by the members themselves), but that did not prevent the group from becoming one of the most successful and original rap collectives in Russia. A characteristic feature of Krovostok's music is the use of profanity in their idiosyncratic monotonous flow. The group's members can be considered representatives of the creative intelligentsia: Shilo is an artist and poet, Feldman is a writer and installation artist, and both are former members of the art collective FenSo (:ru:ФенСо).

History 

Anton Chernyak (Shilo) and Dmitry Fain (Feldman) studied together at Moscow Academic Art Сollege. They later became members of the FenSo artist collective. After this, Shilo took part in the art collective PG. They met the third member of Krovostok, Sergey Krylov (DJ Polutrup), when he was working as a bartender at the PushkinG art club founded by the PG group.

Krovostok uploaded their first tracks on their official website. These tracks later became the group's debut album, Reka krovi.

Krovostok started to perform in Moscow clubs in the fall of 2004, having initially only played private concerts to small groups of people.

In 2005, the group released the track "GidroGash" featuring Mihail Krasnoederevshik. In early 2007, some tracks from the new album Gantelya were posted on the Internet. Phantomas 2000 was the sound producer on the album. Gantelya was released on 24 January 2008. It was stylistically similar to Reka krovi, but the recording quality was higher. Krovostok's popularity grew again.

Krovostok worked closely with the underground rap group 43 Gradusa. 43 Gradusa members Phantomas 2000 and Kot provided backing vocals on the tracks "Del'taplan" and "Razgovory o Napasakh". DJ Polutrup participated in 43 Gradusa's concerts as an audio engineer.

At the turn of 2010-2011, Krovostok released the single "Predstav'te", a song about assassins and human trafficking, as well as the singles "Pora domoi"() and "Dushno"().

On 24 March 2012, the new album Studen was posted as a free download on the group's website.

In 2014, Krovostok released the singles "Nogti", "Cherepovets", and "Seks — eto".

On 6 March 2015, Krovostok released their fifth album, Lombard.

On 26 March 2016, the single "Nayok yok" was released. On 9 August 2016, Krovostok released the single "Dush". On 1 March 2017, they released the single "Golova".

On 23 March 2018, Krovostok released the concert album Krovostok Live, and on 30 March 2018. they released the studio album ChB, containing 11 tracks, including the previously released singles "Nayok yok", "Dush", and "Golova".

 Concert and court case in Yaroslavl 
In 2015, the Federal Drug Control Service office in Yaroslavl filed a complaint to the regional prosecutor, requesting that the prosecutor's office investigate Krovostok's lyrics for compliance with the requirements of Russian legislation. According to the leadership of the Federal Drug Control Service, Krovostok's music contains "a large amount of foul language and slang terms for drugs," and "popularizes non-medical psychoactive narcotic use, random sexual relations, illegal actions, and violence.” In July 2015, the Kirovsky district court in Yaroslavl ruled that Krovostok's lyrics were illegal in Russia and ordered federal censors to block the group's website.

Dmitry Fain, the main author of the lyrics, called the ban on his work unconstitutional and stated that the court's decision would not change the group's concert plans. On 13 October 2015, the Yaroslavl Regional Court held a hearing on the appeal from Krovostok. However, no decision was made on this day, as not all parties were acquainted with the additional materials in the case. The trial was rescheduled for 27 October 2015.

On 12 November, the Yaroslavl regional court overturned the Kirovsky district court's decision on banning the band's songs and blocking the official site. The Prosecutor's office's claims were rejected in full.

 Members 

 Current members 

 Anton Chernyak aka Shilo aka Anton Obval'shchik - vocal, rapping, lyrics
 Dmitry Fain aka Feldman aka Dr. Feldman - lyrics, producer
 Konstantin Rudchik aka Phantomas 2000 - beatmaker, back-vocals, lyrics

 Past members 
 Sergey Krylov aka DJ Polutrup - beatmaker
 Konstantin Arshba aka KotZilla - back vocalist, now is actor of musical Cops on fire

 Discography 

 Studio albums 
 2004 — Blood River («Река крови»)
 2006 — Exit Wound («Сквозное»)
 2008 — Dumbbell («Гантеля»)
 2012 — Aspic («Студень»)
 2015 — Pawnshop («Ломбард»)
 2018 — B&W («ЧБ»)
 2021 — Science («Наука»)

 Concert albums 
 2017 — Krovostok Live

 Singles 
 2004 «Biography» («Биография»)
 «White jaguar» («Белый ягуар»)
 «Cormorants»(«Бакланы»)
 «Talks about blunts»(«Разговоры о Напасах») (feat. Cat(Кот) («43 Grаdusa»))
 2005 «Want some?»(«Хочешь?»)
 «HydroHigh»(«ГидроГаш») (feat. Krasnoe Derevo)
 2007 «Dumbbell»(«Гантеля»)
 «H.P.P»(«ГЭС»)
 «Riots»(«Беспорядки»)
 2011 «Imagine»(«Представьте»)
 «Time to go home»(«Пора домой»)
 «Stuffy»(«Душно»)
 2014 «Nails»(«Ногти»)
 «Cherepovets»(«Череповец»)
 «Sex is»(«Секс Это»)
 2015 «Pawnshop»(«Ломбард»)
 2016 «Nayok yok»(«Наёк ёк»)
 «Shower»(«ДУШ»)
 2017 «Head»(«Голова»)2020'
 «Children»(«Дети»)

Videos 
The band doesn't have any official music videos, all the videos are made by enthusiasts.
 «Lose your head»(Теряю голову») Live (2006)
 «Cormorants»(«Бакланы») Live (2008)
 «Dumbbell»(«Гантеля») karaoke (2009)
 «Riots»(«Беспорядки») karaoke (2009)
 «Villagers»(Колхозники») (2010)
 «H.P.P»(«Г.Э.С») (2010)
 «Jacket»(«Куртец») (2012) (it is a cutting of fragments from the movie «Alien»).
 «Nails»(«Ногти») (ft K.Sobchack) (2015) — clipping of interview of Shilo in Dozhd TV.
 «Cherepovets»(«Череповец») - clip-demonstration of landscapes of the city of Cherepovets by Rina Dragunova

References

External links
 Official website
 Games of dilettantes (Игры диллетантов)
 New Testament (Новый завет)
 Hardcore as it is (Жесть как она есть)
 Meat with blood (Мясо с кровью)
 «Krovostok» - «River of blood» («Кровосток» — «Река крови»)
 From taiga to British seas (От тайги до британских морей)
«Krovostok» - «River of blood» («Кровосток» — «Река крови»)
  — Shilo — About Krovostok, nuthouse and system / interview for Yury Dud (  Шило — о Кровостоке, психушке и совке / вДудь)

Musical groups from Moscow
Russian hip hop
Russian hip hop groups
Russian hip hop musicians
Musical groups established in 2003